Croatia–Czech Republic relations are foreign relations between Croatia and the Czech Republic. Croatia has an embassy in Prague and an honorary consulate in Brno. The Czech Republic has an embassy in Zagreb (and 2 honorary consulates in Rijeka and Split).

Both countries are full members of the European Union and NATO, and both countries are full members of the Council of Europe.

History 
Teritorries of both countries used to be part of the Austria-Hungary until the end of WWI and later on were both part of the Eastern Bloc during the Cold War.

Czechoslovakia recognized Croatia on 16 January 1992. After dissolution of Czechoslovakia, Croatia and the newly established Czech Republic mutually recognized and established diplomatic relations on 1 January 1993.

Culture 
The Croatian and Czech languages both belong to the Slavic language family allowing a small degree of mutual intelligibility. There is a czech ethnic minority in Croatia. Croatia is a popular tourist destination among Czechs.

See also 
 Foreign relations of Croatia
 Foreign relations of the Czech Republic
 Czechoslovakia–Yugoslavia relations

References

External links
 Embassy of Croatia in the Czech Republic 
 Embassy of the Czech Republic in Croatia 

 
Czech Republic
Croatia